The Winter's Tale is a ballet in three acts choreographed by Christopher Wheeldon to a commissioned score by Joby Talbot. The ballet is based on the play of the same name by William Shakespeare. With scenery and costumes designed by Bob Crowley, lighting designed by Natasha Katz, and special stage effects designed by Daniel Brodie and Basil Twist, it was a co-production of the Royal Ballet and the National Ballet of Canada. It was first presented at the Royal Opera House, London, on 10 April 2014. The North American premiere occurred the following year.

Background
Wheeldon's ballet is a dance version of William Shakespeare's play The Winter's Tale (1609–11), considered by scholars one of his "problem plays," difficult to classify as tragedy, comedy, romance, or a combination of all three. The first three of its five acts are filled with intense psychological drama; the last two are lighthearted and comedic, concluding with a happy ending. It tells a complicated story of jealousy, loss, love, joy, redemption, forgiveness, and reconciliation. Shakespeare chose his title to signify to his audiences that the play was like a tale told in company gathered by a fireside on a winter's evening. A fictional invention—not true, but entertaining and morally instructive.

The story
Leontes, king of Sicilia, is possessed by a mad jealousy, believing that his pregnant wife Hermione is having an affair with his childhood friend Polixenes, king of Bohemia. He orders that Hermione's infant daughter be abandoned. Hermione and their young son Mamillius die of distress, and Leontes is overcome with remorse. The baby is found by a shepherd in Bohemia and named Perdita ("the lost one"). Sixteen years pass. Perdita falls in love with Florizel, son of Polixenes, who returns her affections and proposed marriage. Polixenes is outraged that his princely son intends to marry a commoner and is consumed by fury. Florizel and Perdita, pursued by Polixenes, seek refuge in Sicilia at the court of Leontes. Perdita is recognized, Hermione returns from the dead, and the family is reunited.

Casts

Critical reception 

Upon its world premiere at the Royal Opera House, The Winter's Tale was well received by dance critics. Judith Mackrell of The Guardian gave the ballet four out of five stars and praised the ballet as "one of most fully achieved story ballets to be created at the Royal in years." Writing for the Financial Times, Clement Crisp also awarded the ballet four out of five stars and highlighted the individual performances of the lead dancers. Luke Jennings, writing in The Guardian, said that the ballet, although dramatically flawed, was "for the most part a ravishing success" and was definitely "a ballet to keep."

Videography
A performance by the original cast can be seen on Opus Arte DVD 1156D. Directed for the screen by Ross MacGibbon, it was recorded at the Royal Opera House, Covent Garden, in 2014. In light of the impact of the COVID-19 pandemic on the performing arts, the recording was released online.

References

External links 
 Scene from The Winter's Tale performed at the Royal Opera House, 2014

Ballets by Christopher Wheeldon
Ballets created for The Royal Ballet
Ballets based on works by William Shakespeare
Ballets by Joby Talbot
2014 ballet premieres
Bohemia in fiction
Works based on The Winter's Tale